Oregon Bridge Delivery Partners (OBDP), a joint venture of HDR Engineering and Fluor Enterprises, is an engineering and project management company in the U.S. state of Oregon.  The company is under contract to the Oregon Department of Transportation (ODOT) and its Highway Division to manage projects in the Oregon Transportation Investment Act III State Bridge Delivery Program, under which hundreds of bridges in Oregon will be repaired or replaced.

References

Oregon Department of Transportation – Oregon Transportation Investment Act – Oregon Bridge Delivery Partners

External links
Oregon Bridge Delivery Partners (official website)

Companies based in Salem, Oregon
Outsourcing in the United States
Engineering companies of the United States